Bhumiya is a village in Barakot Tahsil, Champawat District, Uttarakhand, India. 

Villages in Champawat district